TV18 Broadcast Limited (formerly Global Broadcast News and IBN18 Broadcast Limited) is an Indian entity belonging to Network18 Group based in Mumbai. TV18 owns and operates various national channels in separate partnerships with NBCUniversal (CNBC TV18, CNBC Awaaz & CNBC-TV18 Prime HD), Warner Bros. Discovery (CNN-News18) and Paramount Global (as majority owner of Viacom18).

In the regional space, the group operates a Gujarati business news channel – CNBC Bajar, a Marathi general news channel – News18 Lokmat and operates ten regional news channels under the News18 umbrella and 3 regional entertainment channels under the News18 brand. The group also operates a 24-hour Indian news channel in English – News18 India, targeting global audiences.

TV18 and Viacom18 have formed a strategic joint venture called IndiaCast, a multi-platform 'content asset monetisation' entity that drives domestic and international channel distribution, placement services and content syndication for the bouquet of channels from the group and third parties.

On 31 January 2018, TV18 increased its stake in the Viacom18 joint venture to 51% taking operational control.

Channels

History 
1992–1999: Production firm

1999–2006: News broadcasting and partnerships

2006–2014: Subsidiary of Network18

2014–Present: Reliance Industries era

References 

Television stations in Mumbai
Companies based in Mumbai
Network18 Group
Mass media companies established in 1996
Year of establishment missing
Companies listed on the National Stock Exchange of India
Companies listed on the Bombay Stock Exchange
Television broadcasting companies of India
Mass media companies of India
Television networks in India
Broadcasting